Chukuchuk is a dish from cuisine of the Marshall Islands. It is a ball shaped made of calrose rice and meat shredded coconut. The size is similar to a golf ball.

It is very popular on Marshall Islands because it is simple to make. It served on special occasions or as a side dish with grilled meat, fish or fruit.

Reference 

Rice dishes
Marshallese cuisine